David W. Pooley (born May 30, 1936) is a former American football coach.  He served as the head football coach at Franklin & Marshall College in Lancaster, Pennsylvania for three seasons, from 1968 to 1970, compiling a record of 10–14.

Head coaching record

References

Living people
1936 births
Place of birth missing (living people)
Franklin & Marshall Diplomats football coaches
High school football coaches in New Jersey